Cheshmeh Rahman (also Romanized as Cheshmeh Raḩmān and Cheshmeh-ye Raḩmān) is a village in Vardasht Rural District, in the Central District of Semirom County, Isfahan Province, Iran. At the 2006 census, its population was 324, in 81 families.

References 

Populated places in Semirom County